Events from the year 1927 in Scotland.

Incumbents 

 Secretary of State for Scotland and Keeper of the Great Seal – Sir John Gilmour, Bt

Law officers 
 Lord Advocate – William Watson
 Solicitor General for Scotland – Alexander Munro MacRobert

Judiciary 
 Lord President of the Court of Session and Lord Justice General – Lord Clyde
 Lord Justice Clerk – Lord Alness
 Chairman of the Scottish Land Court – Lord St Vigeans

Events 
 23 March – Leith by-election: Liberals hold seat.
 16 April – the Scottish Cup Final is broadcast live on radio for the first time. Celtic F.C. beat East Fife 3–1.
 12 July – official opening in Glasgow of the new Kelvin Hall exhibition venue and George V Bridge.
 14 July – the Scottish National War Memorial is opened at Edinburgh Castle (architect: Robert Lorimer).
 26 September – David MacBrayne's paddle steamer Grenadier (1885) catches fire and sinks at her overnight mooring in Oban with the loss of three crew.
 October – a school of pilot whales runs aground in the bay between Bonar Bridge and Ardgay.
 Undated
 The Gillespie, Kidd & Coia architectural practice in Glasgow assumes this name.
 Glasgow University Scottish Nationalist Association formed.
 The Church of Scotland introduces the Church Hymnary, revised edition.

Births 
 24 January – Sir Patrick Macnaghten, 11th Baronet, lieutenant (died 2007)
 16 February – Pearse Hutchinson, poet, broadcaster and translator (died 2012 in Ireland)
 23 February – Willie Ormond, international footballer and manager (died 1984)
 27 February – Jimmy Halliday, Scottish National Party leader (died 2013)
 5 March – Robert Lindsay, 29th Earl of Crawford, politician 
 5 April – Colin Young, film educator
 6 April – Nancy Riach, swimmer (died at 1947 European Aquatics Championships in Monte Carlo)
 12 April – Patrick Meehan, criminal, victim of a miscarriage of justice (died 1994 in Swansea)
 23 June – Kenneth McKellar, tenor (died 2010)
 29 June – Tom Fleming, actor, director, poet and broadcast commentator (died 2010)
 2 July – James Mackay, Baron Mackay of Clashfern, Lord Chancellor
 1 October – Sandy Gall, television journalist (born in Penang)
 5 October – Bruce Millan, Labour Secretary of State for Scotland (died 2013)
 7 October – R. D. Laing, psychiatrist (died 1989 in Saint-Tropez)
 10 October – Thomas Wilson, composer (died 2001)
 31 October – Charles Cameron, bizarre magician (died 2001)
 7 November – Melissa Stribling, film and television actress (died 1992 in Watford)
 27 November – Arnold Clark, businessman (died 2017)
 24 December – John Glashan, born McGlashan, cartoonist (died 1999)
 Sir James Dunbar-Nasmith, conservation architect

Deaths 
 16 January – Haldane Burgess historian, poet, novelist, violinist, linguist and socialist, a noted figure in Shetland's cultural history (born 1862)
 16 March – Sir Henry Craik, 1st Baronet, civil servant, writer and Unionist politician (born 1846; died in London)
 17 March – James Scott Skinner, dancing master, fiddler and composer (born 1843)
 26 June – Thomas P. Marwick, architect (born 1854)
 8 July – Charles Hay, 20th Earl of Erroll, soldier and Conservative politician (born 1852)
 21 July – William Campbell, Lord Skerrington, judge (born 1855)
 September – John George Govan businessman and evangelist, founder of The Faith Mission in 1886 (born 1861)
 10 November – James Thomson, City Engineer, City Architect and Housing Director of Dundee (born 1852)

The arts
 15 September – Green's Playhouse opens in Glasgow, the largest cinema in Europe at this date.
 Joe Corrie's play In Time o' Strife, showing the effect of the General Strike on the Fife coal mining community, is first performed; and his The Image o' God and Other Poems is published.
 Royal Fine Art Commission for Scotland formed.

See also 
 Timeline of Scottish history
 1927 in Northern Ireland

References 

 
Years of the 20th century in Scotland
Scotland
1920s in Scotland